The Howard Hughes Corporation is a real estate development and management company based in The Woodlands, Texas. It was formed in 2010 as a spin-off from General Growth Properties (GGP). Most of its holdings are focused on several master-planned communities. It takes its name from the original Howard Hughes Corporation, which had developed the planned community of Summerlin, Nevada, and later became a subsidiary of GGP.

History
General Growth Properties filed for Chapter 11 bankruptcy protection in 2009. The company proposed a reorganization plan that included spinning off a new company named General Growth Opportunities, which would include those properties that had long-term development potential but little or no income. The name of the proposed spin-off was later changed to The Howard Hughes Corporation (HHC). The spin-off of HHC to GGP's shareholders was completed on November 9, 2010, when GGP exited bankruptcy. The new company held a portfolio that included GGP's master planned communities, mixed-use developments, and undeveloped land. Hedge fund manager Bill Ackman was appointed chairman of the new company.

In 2019, in response to investor disappointment with the company's stock price, HHC conducted a review of strategic options, including the possibility of selling the company. Ultimately, the company announced a "transformation plan", under which it would focus on its master-planned communities and sell off $2 billion of non-core assets. HHC moved its headquarters from Dallas to The Woodlands in 2020 as a cost-cutting measure under this plan.

Current properties
The company divides its properties into four segments: master planned communities, operating assets, the Seaport District, and strategic developments.

Master planned communities
 Bridgeland, Texas
 Columbia, Maryland
 Summerlin, Nevada
 The Woodlands, Texas
 The Woodlands Hills, Texas

Operating assets
This category comprises 76 revenue-generating assets, including retail, office, multi-family residential, and hotel properties, most of which are located in the company's five master planned communities. The portfolio includes 15 retail properties with 2.7 million square feet of space; 33 office properties with 7.7 million square feet of space; 12 apartment complexes with a total of 3,840 units; and 3 hotel properties with a total of 909 rooms. Notable properties include:

 110 North Wacker – Chicago, Illinois
 Downtown Summerlin – Summerlin, Nevada
 Kewalo Basin Harbor – Honolulu, Hawaii
 Las Vegas Aviators baseball team
 Las Vegas Ballpark – Summerlin, Nevada
 Outlet Collection at Riverwalk – New Orleans, Louisiana
 Summerlin Hospital – Summerlin, Nevada (5 percent interest)
 Ward Village retail – Honolulu, Hawaii
 The Woodlands Resort – The Woodlands, Texas

Seaport District
This segment consists of properties at the South Street Seaport in Manhattan.

Strategic developments
The company lists 18 strategic projects, in various stages of development. Notable projects include:

 Air rights over Fashion Show Mall – Las Vegas, Nevada (80 percent interest)
 Landmark Mall – Alexandria, Virginia
 Ward Village condominiums – Honolulu, Hawaii

References

External links
Howard Hughes Corporation website
Light-duty/civilian part of Hughes Helicopters, sold off by McDonnell-Douglas in 1995

Companies listed on the New York Stock Exchange
Companies based in Las Vegas
Companies based in Summerlin, Nevada
Howard Hughes
Shopping center management firms